Choate Hall & Stewart LLP, commonly referred to as "Choate",  is a Boston-based law firm. The firm is known for having a one-office approach to its operations.

Recognition 
In 2019, The Vault named Choate one of the top ten law firms to work for in the United States. That same year, the Firm's summer associate program was ranked number seven in the country.

History

Choate, Hall & Stewart was founded in 1899 by Charles F. Choate Jr. and John L. Hall, later joined by Ralph A. Stewart.

Poet Archibald MacLeish practiced at the firm for three years in the early 1920s.

In 2018, Choate, Hall & Stewart joined other national law firms in raising salaries for first-year associates. During the same year, the firm acted as legal counsel for Phoenix Tower International during its purchase of telecommunication assets in the Dominican Republic.

In 2019, Choate, Hall & Stewart represented Dennis Publishing in their acquisition of Kiplinger Washington Editors Inc.

Choate, Hall & Stewart has long engaged in the practice, common only among Boston law firms, of serving as an investment broker, particularly in the 21st century. The firm’s money management affiliate goes by the name of Choate Investment Advisors.

References

External links
Official site
Profile of firm

Law firms based in Boston
Law firms established in 1899
1899 establishments in Massachusetts